Aniruddha Saha (born 8 November 1990) is an Indian first-class cricketer who plays for Tripura. He made his first-class debut for Tripura in the 2016-17 Ranji Trophy on 29 November 2016.

References

External links
 

1992 births
Living people
Indian cricketers
Tripura cricketers